is a Japanese actress and singer. Sakurai was a member of I'm Enterprise but later became freelance until her retirement. She previously announced her retirement on September 1, 2016, but on June 1, 2019, she announced that she would return to the entertainment industry.

Career

Debut 
At 14, Sakurai debuted as a sub-member for "Kiss Fairlies," a group that worked as campaign girls for the local Kijima Motorcycle Racing Team. All members were over 15 years old, aside from Tomo.

In age of "Lemon Angel" 
At 17, she joined the idol-pop unit, Lemon Angel, a counter project of Cream Lemon coordinated by the same company that produced "Kiss Fairlies". The project contained comic, animated, and idol pop units. The unit played themselves in Midnight Anime Lemon Angel. She released 5 albums during her time at Lemon Angel.

After Lemon Angel 
Sakurai joined a new video game idol unit and released one album with this unit. After leaving, she focused her career mainly on voice acting work.

Retirement 
On September 1, 2016, Sakurai announced her retirement from her professional voice acting and singing careers on her official blog post titled "Arigato/Thank You."

She explained: "I used to have a strong vocal cord that couldn't be broken and became stronger even after singing for hours. But recently, I have realized it's becoming more and more difficult for me to use my important voice as an actress. I know it's a natural thing as time goes by, but I can't accept the change, then I understand it's almost time to retire."

Return 
On June 1, 2019, Sakurai announced that she was returning to the entertainment industry.

Filmography

Television animation 
 Akazukin Chacha (1994), Marin
 Macross 7 (1994), Mylene Jenius
 El-Hazard (1995), Shayla Shayla
 Saint Tail (1995), Meimi Haneoka/Saint Tail
 Rurouni Kenshin (1996), Makimachi Misao
 Super Doll Licca-chan (1998),  Doll Licca
 Shakugan no Shana (2005), Chigusa Sakai
 My-Otome (2005), Lena Sayers
 Yu-Gi-Oh! Duel Monsters GX (2006), Mizuchi Saio
 Idolmaster: Xenoglossia (2007), Azusa Miura
 Pocket Monsters: Diamond & Pearl (2007), Cynthia/Shirona
 Gintama (2009), Hinowa
 The World God Only Knows (2010), Asuka Sora
 Kuromajo-san ga Toru!! (2012), Choco's Mother
 Pocket Monsters: Best Wishes! 2 (2012), Cynthia/Shirona
 Pocket Monsters (2021), Yoshino, Cynthia/Shirona

Theatrical animation 
 Fatal Fury: The Motion Picture (1994), Sulia Gaudeamus

Original video animation 
 Shamanic Princess (1996), Sara
 Voltage Fighter Gowcaizer (1996), Karin Son
 Rurouni Kenshin: New Kyoto Arc (2011), Makimachi Misao

Video games 
 Samurai Shodown III (1995), Rimururu
 Tengai Makyō: Daiyon no Mokushiroku (1997), Yumemi
 The Super Dimension Fortress Macross (2003), Emma Granger

Audio drama 
 Rurouni Kenshin, Kamiya Kaoru

Dubbing

Live-action 
Admission, Portia Nathan (Tina Fey)
The City of Your Final Destination, Arden Langdon (Charlotte Gainsbourg)
Dragon Blade, Parthian Queen (Lorie Pester)
The Monkey King, Chang'e (Gigi Leung)
The Taking of Tiger Mountain, Ma Qinglian (Yu Nan)
Third Person, Julia Weiss (Mila Kunis)
Young Detective Dee: Rise of the Sea Dragon, Yin Ruiji (Angelababy)

Animation 
Robinson Crusoe, Kiki
 Chaotic, Codemaster Amzen
 The Marvelous Misadventures of Flapjack, Flapjack

References

External links 
 Tomo Sakurai at GamePlaza-Haruka Voice Acting Database 
 Tomo Sakurai at Hitoshi Doi's Seiyuu Database
 

1971 births
Living people
I'm Enterprise voice actors
Japanese idols
Japanese video game actresses
Japanese voice actresses
Japanese women pop singers
People from Ichikawa, Chiba
20th-century Japanese women singers
20th-century Japanese singers
21st-century Japanese women singers
21st-century Japanese singers
20th-century Japanese actresses
21st-century Japanese actresses

pt:Anexo:Lista de seiyū#S